The Mosher Farmstead is located at 1016 Sherwood Road in Aurora, New York.  The farm was established in 1887 when it was purchased by E.W. Mosher, and remains in the Mosher family today. It is significant as a largely intact example of a late eighteenth/early nineteenth century farm.  Various buildings on the farm, especially the large U-shaped barn, are also significant architecturally.  The entire farm was added to the National Register of Historic Places in 2003.

References

Houses on the National Register of Historic Places in New York (state)
Houses in Cayuga County, New York
Historic districts on the National Register of Historic Places in New York (state)
National Register of Historic Places in Cayuga County, New York
Farms on the National Register of Historic Places in New York (state)